Koratty is a census town in Thrissur district in the Indian state of Kerala. It is a main centre of Marian Pilgrimage.

Demographics 
As of 2011 India census, Koratty had a population of 17,618. Males constitute 49% of the population and females 51%.  Koratty has an average literacy rate of 96.72%, higher than the national average of 74%: male literacy is 97.94%, and female literacy is 95.58%.  In Koratty, 9% of the population is under 6 years of age.

Tourism & Pilgrimage Travel

Saint Mary's Syro-Malabar Catholic Church, Koratty 
Saint Mary's Syro-Malabar Catholic Church, Koratty is one of the biggest Marian/Christian/Catholic pilgrimage travel destination of Kerala in India. Korattymuthy Shrine is a Pilgrimage centre in Kerala. It is also known as the Lourdes of Kerala. Korattymuthy- Our Lady with Poovan Bananas is the well known name for Holy Mary or Mother Mary here. Devotees from all over the world visit Koratty annually. Every year the Feast of Koratty Muthy will commence on 1st Sunday after 10 October. The flag for the feast will be hoisted on the previous Wednesday.

Other religious places 
Main Hindu Temples located in Koratty are Sree Rameswaram Mahadeva Temple, Thaliyaparambil rudhiramala bagavathi azhuvancheri muthappan temple & Sreedharmashasta temple, Khannanagar.

Industry 
Koratty was famous for its industrial units. Vaigai Thread Processors Ltd. (formerly J&P Coats, Jamuna Threads & Madura Coats and Coats Viella (I) Ltd.  The Vaigai Thread Processors, formerly J&P Coats, was started on 98 acres of land given on a 99-year lease by the government in 1952. In 1980, it merged with Madura Coats Limited and it was declared locked out in 1993 following a labour dispute.  Another major industry was in Public Sector under the control of Government of India - Government of India Press, Koratty (GIPK). The press was started in 1966 on a 100-acre land. It was the one and only Indian Government controlled press in Kerala. The press was started in Koratty due to the intervention of Panampilly Govinda Menon, former CM of Travancore-Cochin region and renowned Kerala politician. He was a union minister and pushed for the establishment of press for giving more job opportunities for the local people. Earlier it had been proposed to convert it into a security press for the printing of Stamp Papers and Postal Stamps etc. At that time there were 300 workers. By 1972, the number of workers rose to 425 working in two shifts.  On a part of modernization drive & due to non-feasibility, Govt of India UM has decided to shut down its operation. In 2017, the union cabinet decided to merge the Koratty unit with Nashik unit. Only 14 workers were left while press stopped functioning, 12 merged with Nashik press, while the remaining two merged with Delhi press. Other industries like Carborandum Universal, Kerala Chemicals & Proteins Ltd (KCPL) are also located here.

Panampilly Govinda Menon, former Chief Minister of Kerala and former Central Cabinet Minister for Railways, was the frontrunner in bringing these industries to Koratty and nearby areas as he was a native of Kathikudam near Koratty.

Koratty have their own news portal name Ente Koratty.

MVS Info Tech are is headquartered in Koratty. MVS Group is also planning to set up their IT campus by 2014 at Koratty

Kinfra Park 

Another industrial area situated in Koratty is Kinfra Small Industries Promotion Park (KSIPP), lot of small scale industrial units are situated inside the park. It is located 0.5 km east of Koratty Jn. on Konoor Rd.

Infopark Thrissur 
An IT park is started functioning in this town from 10 October 2009 -known as Infopark Thrissur. More than 30 companies are functioning in this park. Infopark Thrissur is considered to provide direct employment to 3,000 people and may boost the real estate sector in this area. The new upcoming campus consisting of a multistory building, with more than one lakh square feet built up area got Special economic zone (SEZ) status from government of India in July 2014. and will be known as 'INFOPARK -Koratty'

Educational Institutions 

Several educational institutions are located in Koratty Town and nearby areas. Mar Augustine Memorial Higher Secondary School (MAMHS), Little Flower Convent Higher Secondary School (LFCGHSS), Government Poly Technic College (GPC),  Naipunnya Institute of Management and Information Technology, Perpetual Succour Higher Secondary School (PSHSS), Thirumudikkunnu are the major institutions of Koratty.

References

External links 

 Korattymuthy Portal - Site Dedicated To KorattyMuthy
 Official Site dedicated to Korattymuthy

Cities and towns in Thrissur district